The highveld golden mole (Amblysomus septentrionalis) is a species of mammal in the golden mole family, Chrysochloridae. It is found in South Africa and Eswatini. Its natural habitats are forests, moist savanna, temperate shrubland and grassland, subtropical or tropical dry lowland grassland, arable land, pastureland, plantations, rural gardens, and urban areas.

References

Afrosoricida
Mammals of South Africa
Taxonomy articles created by Polbot
Mammals described in 1913